Baía do Galeão is a bay on the north coast of the island of Maio in Cape Verde. The nearest village is Cascabulho,  to the south. The bay was mentioned as "Ghelloons" in the 1747 map by Jacques-Nicolas Bellin.

References

Bays of Cape Verde
Geography of Maio, Cape Verde